P. Pullayya (also spelled P. Pullaiah; 1911–1985) was an Indian film director and producer known for his work in Telugu films. He was the recipient of Raghupathi Venkaiah Award for his contributions to Telugu cinema.

Personal life

Pullayya married veteran actress Santha Kumari in 1937. Together they have two daughters named, Padmavathi and Radha

Film career

Pullayya produced and directed many successful films under the banner Padmasree Pictures named after their daughter.

Jayabheri was a 1959 Telugu musical hit film directed by him and starring Akkineni Nageswara Rao and Anjali Devi in lead roles. The film is based on the 1947 production by V. Shantaram, titled Lokshahir Ram Joshi in Marathi and Matwala Shayar Ram Joshi in Hindi. The songs in the movie are both classical Carnatic and Folklore with music composed by Pendyala Nageswara Rao.

Sri Venkateswara Mahatyam was a 1960 magnum opus Telugu film produced and directed by him and starring N. T. Rama Rao. The story is based on the story of Lord Venkateswara (Balaji).

Filmography
 Harishchandra (1935) (director)
 Sarangadhara (1937) (director)
 Balaji (1939) (director)
 Dharmapatni (1941) (director and producer)
 Premabandhan (1941) (director)
 Subhadra (1941) (director)
 Bhagyalakshmi (1943) (director)
 Maya Machhindra (1945) (director)
 Bhaktha Jana (1948) (director)
Macha Rekai (1950) (director)
 Tirugubatu (1950) (director)
 Veetukari (1950) (director)
 Dharma Devatha (1952) (director)
 Manam Pola Mangalyam (1953) (director)
 Rechukka (1954) (director)
 Kanyasulkam (1955) (director)
 Ardhangi (1955) (director and producer)
 Pennin Perumai (1956) (director and producer)
 Umasundari (1956) (director)
 Vanangamudi (1957) (director)
 Illarame Nallaram (1958) (director)
 Athisaya Thirudan (1958) (director)
 Jayabheri (1959) (director)
 Kalaivaanan (1959) (director)
 Banda Ramudu (1959) (director)
 Sri Venkateswara Mahatyam (1960) (director and producer)
 Siri Sampadalu (1962) (director and producer)
 Murali Krishna  (1964) (director)
 Aasai Mugam (1965) (director)
 Preminchi Choodu (1965) (director and producer)
 Thaye Unakkaga (1966) (director)
 Prana Mithrulu (1967) (director and producer)
 Alludu Menalludu (1970) (director and producer)
 Koduku Kodalu (1972) (director and producer)
 Andaru Bagundali (1975) (director)

Awards
National Film Awards
1955: Certificate of Merit for Best Feature Film in Telugu - Ardhangi
1959: Certificate of Merit for Best Feature Film in Telugu - Jayabheri
1962: Certificate of Merit for the Third Best Feature Film in Telugu - Siri Sampadalu

Filmfare Awards
Filmfare Best Film Award (Telugu) - Ardhangi (1955)

Nandi Awards
Raghupathi Venkaiah Award - 1981

See also
 Raghupathi Venkaiah Award

References

External links
 

1911 births
1985 deaths
Telugu film directors
Film directors from Andhra Pradesh
People from Nellore
Telugu film producers
Film producers from Andhra Pradesh
20th-century Indian film directors